Tulsi TV is a Hindi-language 24/7 devotional television channel, owned by Tulsai TV Group Asia Limited, in Noida, India.

References

Hindi-language television channels in India
Television channels and stations established in 2012
Hindi-language television stations
Television channels based in Noida
2012 establishments in Uttar Pradesh